Peaches is a 2004 Australian film, written by Sue Smith and directed by Craig Monahan. The music was by David Hirschfelder, cinematography by Ernie Clark A.C.S., editing by Suresh Ayyar and art direction by Paula Smith.

Plot
Steph (Emma Lung) lost her parents in a car accident while still a baby. She was raised by her parents' over-protective best friend, Jude (Jacqueline McKenzie). She receives her dead mother's locked diary on her 18th birthday, the same day she starts work at the local peach cannery, and begins dual journeys, one pushing into the mysterious past and the other pursuing romantic complications in the present. The diary "reveals the colourful and sexy past of those close to her."

Steph learns about her mother Jass (Samantha Healy), her father Johnny (Tyson Contor), and about the difficulties of love with her boss Alan Taylor (Hugo Weaving).

"Peaches is a love story that deals with accepting loss and change, and learning to move on."

The director said of the characters: "They’re all just people. In fact Sue (Smith, writer) wanted more bonking in it, so that was never an issue", he adds gamely. "There’re different journeys for different people; I spent a lot of time making that a reality. Men over 40 will go with Hugo’s journey; I find women around 30 plus will go with Jacqui; younger people go with Emma, but young men don’t go with the film at all... I’ve seen it in three countries [at festivals and previews] with many different audiences, and I do find there are different journeys for different people."

Cast

Hugo Weaving as Alan
Jacqueline McKenzie as Jude
Emma Lung as Steph
Matthew Le Nevez as Brian
Samantha Healy as Jass
Tyson Contor as Johnny
Catherine Lambert as Kath
Giang Le Huy as Thuy
Felicity Electricity as Sandy
Ling Yeow as Chen Poh
Caroline Mignon as MariaDuncan Hemstock as Kenny CarterEd Rosser as GrandpaPeter Michell as DaveLimited Edition Standee's of the Cast were also made available

Release
The film premiered at the Montreal World Film Festival on	30 August 2004, at the Boomerang Australian Film Festival (Hungary) on 24 September 2004, at the Hollywood Film Festival in the USA on 17 October 2004, at the 2005 Adelaide Film Festival on 26 February 2005, and at the Cannes Film Market on 11 May 2005.

Classification
The Australian Government Classification Board rated Peaches MA 15+ for its strong themes, strong sex scenes, and strong coarse language.

Critical reception
Julie Rigg at Radio National wrote that: "This is not a bad little movie ... perhaps a little well-mannered in the way it has its actors front the screen, but at least these are not ocker caricatures we’re seeing here."

Margaret Pomeranz objected to the central sexual relationship of the film. "I know I sound like a Victorian aunt, but I really hated that betrayal of that relationship between Alan and Steph. I mean, it's not the older man, younger woman thing, it isn't, it's almost like he's her father and it's almost like an incestuous relationship. A film takes a step like that and it takes me where I really don't want to go. I reacted against everybody, I felt alienated from those characters at that moment."

Sandra Hall of the Sydney Morning Herald took a (slightly) different line. "Then the unlikely but predictable happens. As Steph's romance with the past intensifies, she and 42-year-old Alan have an affair. You can see it looming, yet wish you couldn't for, once it hits, the resulting subterfuges and secret meetings rip all credibility out of the storyline. From then on, it's up to the actors to keep it from falling apart - something they do by generating such goodwill that it seems mean-spirited not to stay with them."

Sarah Barnett of the Sydney Anglican Network said, "Moody and absorbing, Peaches avoids creating clichéd or overly eccentric characters opting for more believable, richly drawn men and women. Audiences should note that the film does contain explicit sex scenes. While the relationship these scenes depicts is key to the plot, the level of nudity does seem somewhat exploitative of Emma Lung.  Elegantly written and filmed Peaches is compelling but not entirely satisfying as a drama. Despite strong performances, a haunting score and good production values its ending is somewhat bittersweet."

Fr Richard Leonard SJ of the Catholic Church in Australia, said that "What many Catholic viewers will not care for is the number and style of the sexual encounters between an 18 years old innocent and her 42-year-old married boss, especially when we know that Alan was for the first year or so of Steph's life Jude's partner and her surrogate father. Whatever of the theme of Steph recreating history, this worrying suggestion of incest and work place harassment highlights how dysfunctional the relationships are between the three main players."

Box officePeaches'' grossed $407,088 at the box office in Australia,.

See also

 Australian films of 2004
 Cinema of Australia
 List of Australian films

References

External links
 

2004 films
Australian drama films
Films set in South Australia
Films scored by David Hirschfelder
2004 drama films
2000s English-language films